This page lists tree and large shrub species native to Georgia, as well as cultivated, invasive, naturalized, and introduced species.

Native trees

Introduced, naturalized, and invasive trees

References 

Lists of trees
Trees of the Southeastern United States
Flora of Georgia (U.S. state)